Othón Pompeyo Blanco Núñez de Cáceres (March 7, 1868 in Padilla, Tamaulipas – October 18, 1959 in Mexico City) was a Mexican Marine and the founder of the city of Chetumal who served as undersecretary of the Mexican Navy from 1941 to 1946.

The municipality of Othón P. Blanco, Quintana Roo, is named after him.

References 

1868 births
1959 deaths
People from Tamaulipas